Fort Ware Airport  is located adjacent to Fort Ware, British Columbia, Canada.

See also
Fort Ware Water Aerodrome

References

Registered aerodromes in British Columbia
Northern Interior of British Columbia
Peace River Regional District